Dzyanis Lebedzew (born 26 June 1992 is a Belarusian former footballer.

In July 2020 Lebedzew was found guilty of being involved in a match-fixing schema in Belarusian football. He was sentenced to 1 year of house arrest and banned from Belarusian football for three years.

References

External links
 
 
 Profile at Belshina website

1992 births
Living people
Belarusian footballers
Association football goalkeepers
FC Belshina Bobruisk players
FC Khimik Svetlogorsk players
FC Bereza-2010 players
People from Babruysk
Sportspeople from Mogilev Region